Gulnare (pronounced GUL ner) is an unincorporated community in Las Animas County, Colorado, United States.

Geography
Gulnare is located at  (37.3172387, -104.7519341). The community lies southwest of Aguilar and southeast of the Spanish Peaks in the Apishapa River Valley. It is known for The Spanish Peaks Inn, a popular tavern and adjoining RV park.

Name
The community's original name was Abeyton, but the post office required a name change. Residents sent prospective new names in an envelope to the post office's Washington headquarters, but all the names were rejected. The envelope had a drawing of a cow called "Princess of Gulnare," and the post office decided to choose Gulnare for the town's name.

References

Unincorporated communities in Las Animas County, Colorado
Unincorporated communities in Colorado